Henry Christopher Bailey (1 February 1878 – 24 March 1961) was an English author of detective fiction.

Life

Bailey was born in London. He studied Classics at Oxford University, earning a B.A. in 1901. Bailey began working as a journalist for The Daily Telegraph, writing war journalism, drama reviews, and editorials for the newspaper.

In 1908, Bailey married Lydia Haden Janet Guest (d. 1971). They had two daughters, Betty Lydia Bennett (nee Bailey; d. 1972) and Mary Dorothy Bailey.

Bailey retired from writing in 1950, and spent the last years of his life living in North Wales. He died on 24 March 1961, aged 83, in Llanfairfechan. His estate was valued at £14991 7s. 7d., and his widow was the sole heir.

Fiction

Bailey wrote mainly short stories featuring a medically qualified detective called Reggie Fortune (a surgeon, hence he is known as 'Mr Fortune').  Fortune's mannerisms and speech put him into the same class as Lord Peter Wimsey but the stories are much darker, and often involve murderous obsession, police corruption, financial skulduggery, child abuse and miscarriages of justice.  Although Mr Fortune is seen at his best in short stories, he also appears in several novels.

A second series character, Joshua Clunk, is a sanctimonious lawyer who exposes corruption and blackmail in local politics, and who manages to profit from the crimes. He appears in eleven novels published between 1930 and 1950, including The Sullen Sky Mystery (1935), widely regarded as Bailey's magnum opus.

Bailey also wrote historical fiction. His first historical novel, My Lady of Orange (1901) revolves around William the Silent, and his involvement in the Dutch Revolt.

Bailey's works were published in a number of magazines, primarily The Windsor Magazine and Adventure and reprinted in Ellery Queen's Mystery Magazine.

Works

Romantic and historic fiction 

 My Lady of Orange (1901). Serialised, Longman's Magazine, December 1900 to May 1901	
 Karl of Erbach (1903). Serialised as Prince Karl, Longman's Magazine, July 1992 to March 1903
 The Master of Gray (1903)
 Rimingtons (1904)
 Beaujeu (1905). Serialised, Monthly Review, UNKNOWN MONTH to UNKNOWN MONTH 1905
 Under Castle Walls (1906), aka Springtime. Serialised as "Springtime", The Idler, April to November 1906
 Raoul, a Gentleman of Fortune (1907), aka A Gentleman of Fortune: Serialised, Pall Mall Magazine, May to December 1906
 The God of Clay (1908):  Serialised, Pall Mall Magazine, January to December 1907
 Colonel Stow (1908)
 Storm and Treasure (1910)
 The Lonely Lady (1911)
 The Suburban (1912)
 The Sea Captain (1913) Serialized, The Grand Magazine, January to December 1912.; and in Adventure, September 1911 to January 1913
 The Gentleman Adventurer (1914)
 The Highwayman (1915)
 The Gamesters (1916)
 The Young Lovers (1917)
 The Pillar of Fire (1918)
 Barry Leroy (1919)
 His Serene Highness (1920)
 The Fool (1921); serialised, Everybody's Magazine, June to September 1921. Historical novel about Henry II of England
 The Plot (1922)
 The Rebel (1923)
 Knight at Arms (1924) Historical novel set in the time of Charles VIII of France
 The Golden Fleece (1925)
 The Merchant Prince (1926)
 Bonaventure (1927)
 Judy Bovenden (1928). Serialised, Daily Telegraph, 3 August 1928 to 13 September 1928
 The Roman Eagles (1929), juvenile
 Mr Cardonnel (1931)

Detective fiction 
 Call Mr Fortune (1920), short stories collection
"The Archduke's Tea" (Boston Tribune, 15 May 1921)
"The Sleeping Companion" (Boston Tribune, 22 May 1921)
"The Nice Girl" (Boston Tribune, 29 May 1921)
"The Efficient Assassin" (Boston Tribune, 5 June 1921)
"The Hottentot Venus" (Boston Tribune, 12 June 1921)
"The Business Minister" (Boston Tribune, 19 and 26 June 1921)
 Mr Fortune's Practice (1923), short stories collection
"The Ascot Tragedy" (People's Magazine, 1 May 1923)
"The President of San Jacinto" (People's Magazine, 1 February 1923, as 'The President of San Isidro')
"The Young Doctor"
"The Magic Stone" (People's Magazine, 1 January 1923)
"The Snowball Burglary" (People's Magazine, 15 January 1923)
"The Leading Lady" (People's Magazine, 1 April 1923, as 'The Vanishing Lady')
"The Unknown Murderer" (People's Magazine, 1 March 1923)
 Mr Fortune's Trials (1925), short stories collection
"The Young God" (London Magazine, August 1924; Washington Star, 1 August 1926)
"The Only Son" (London Magazine, November 1924; Flynn's, 7 March 1925)
"The Furnished Cottage" (London Magazine, December 1924; Flynn's, 21 March 1925)
"The Hermit Crab" (London Magazine, October 1924; Flynn's, 21 February 1925)
"The Long Barrow" (London Magazine, January 1925; Washington Star, 19 September 1926)
"The Profiteers" (London Magazine, September 1924; Washington Star, 3 October 1926)
 Mr Fortune, Please (1928), short stories collection
"The Missing Husband" (Flynn's Weekly, 18 September 1926)
"The Cat Burglar" (Flynn's Weekly, 6 November 1926)
"The Lion Party" (Flynn's Weekly, 2 October 1926)
"The Violet Farm" (Flynn's Weekly, 22 January 1927)
"The Quiet Lady" (Flynn's Weekly, 16 October 1926)
"The Little House" (Flynn's Weekly, 9 October 1926)
 Mr Fortune Speaking (1929), short stories collection
"Zodiacs" (Flynn's Weekly Detective Fiction, 19 November 1927, as 'Zodiacs'; Windsor Magazine, May 1928)
"The Cat's Milk"
"The Pink Macaw" (Flynn's Weekly Detective Fiction, 4 February 1928)
"The Hazel Ice" (Flynn's Weekly Detective Fiction, 10 December 1927)
"The Painted Pebbles" (Flynn's Weekly Detective Fiction, 26 November 1927; Windsor Magazine, June 1928)
"The Woman in Wood" (Flynn's Weekly Detective Fiction, 17 March 1928)
"The German Song"
"The Lion Fish" (Flynn's Weekly Detective Fiction, 12 November 1927; Windsor Magazine, April 1928)
 Garstons / The Garston Murder Case (1930; Clunk)
 Mr Fortune Explains (1930), short stories collection
"The Picnic"
"The Little Milliner"
"The Wedding Ring" (Windsor Magazine, February 1930)
"The Football Photograph" (The Delineator, 1 July 1929)
"The Rock Garden" (The Delineator, January 1930; Windsor Magazine, January 1930)
"The Silver Cross" (The Delineator, February 1930)
"The Bicycle Lamp"
"The Face in the Picture"
 Case for Mr Fortune (1932), short stories collection
"The Greek Play" (Winnipeg Tribune, 27 September 1930; Windsor Magazine, October 1931)
"The Mountain Meadow" (Windsor Magazine, January 1932)
"The Pair of Spectacles" (Windsor Magazine, September 1931)
"A Bunch of Grapes" (The Delineator, November 1931; Windsor Magazine, November 1931)
"The Sported Oak" (Windsor Magazine, April 1932)
"The Oak Gall" (Windsor Magazine, May 1932)
"The Little Dog" (Windsor Magazine, March 1932 as "The Small Dog")
"The Walrus Ivory" (The Delineator, February 1932; Windsor Magazine, February 1932)
 The Red Castle / The Red Castle Mystery (1932; Clunk)
 The Man in the Cape (1933)
 Mr Fortune Wonders (1933), short stories collection
"The Cigarette Case" (The Delineator, May 1933, as 'The Mystery of the Missing Cigarettes; Windsor Magazine, May 1933)
"The Yellow Diamonds" (Windsor Magazine, June 1933)
"The Lilies of St. Gabriel's" (Windsor Magazine, August 1933)
"The Gipsy Moth" (The Delineator, October 1933; Windsor Magazine, October 1933)
"The Fairy Cycle" (Windsor Magazine, November 1933)
"The Oleander Flowers" (Windsor Magazine, December 1933)
"The Love Bird" (Windsor Magazine, September 1933)
"The Old Bible" (The Delineator, July 1933; Windsor Magazine, July 1933)
 Shadow on the Wall (1934; Fortune, cameo by Clunk)
 Mr Fortune Objects (1935), short stories collection
"The Broken Toad" (Windsor Magazine, October 1934)
"The Angel's Eye" (Windsor Magazine, November 1934)
"The Little Finger" (Windsor Magazine, December 1934)
"The Three Bears" (Windsor Magazine, February 1935)
"The Long Dinner" (Windsor Magazine, January 1935)
"The Yellow Slugs" (Windsor Magazine, March 1935)
 The Sullen Sky Mystery (1935; Clunk)
 A Clue for Mr Fortune (1936), short stories collection
"The Torn Stocking"
"The Swimming Pool" (Windsor Magazine, April 1936)
"The Hole in the Parchment" (Windsor Magazine, May 1936)
"The Holy Well" (Windsor Magazine, June 1936)
"The Wistful Goddess" (Windsor Magazine, August 1936)
"The Dead Leaves" (Windsor Magazine, July 1936)
 Black Land, White Land (1937; Fortune)
 Clunk's Claimant / The Twittering Bird Mystery (1937; Clunk, cameo by Fortune)
 This is Mr Fortune (1938), short stories collection
"The Yellow Cloth" (Windsor Magazine, April 1938)
"The Children's Home" (Windsor Magazine, August 1938)
"The Lizard's Tail" (Windsor Magazine, May 1938)
"The Cowslip Ball" (Windsor Magazine, June 1938)
"The Burnt Tout" (Windsor Magazine, July 1938)
"The Key of the Door" (Windsor Magazine, September 1938)
 The Great Game (1939; Fortune, cameo by Clunk)
 The Veron Mystery / Mr Clunk's Text (1939; Clunk, cameo by Fortune)
 Mr Fortune Here (1940), short stories collection
"The Bottle Party" (Strand Magazine, October 1939)
"The Primrose Petals" (Strand Magazine, April 1940)
"The Spider's Web" (Strand Magazine, November 1939)
"The Fight for the Crown"
"The Point of the Knife" (Strand Magazine, March 1940)
"The Gilded Girls"
"The Brown Paper"
"The Blue Paint" (Strand Magazine, February 1940)
"The Bird in the Cellar"
 The Bishop's Crime (1940; Fortune)
 The Little Captain / Orphan Ann(1941; Clunk)
 No Murder / The Apprehensive Dog (1942; Fortune)
 Dead Man's Shoes / Nobody's Vineyard (1942; Clunk)
 Mr Fortune Finds a Pig (1943; Fortune)
 Slippery Ann / The Queen of Spades (1944; Clunk)
 Dead Man's Effects / The Cat's Whisker (1945; Fortune)
 The Wrong Man (1946; Clunk)
 The Life Sentence (1946; Fortune)
 Honour Among Thieves (1947; Clunk)
 Saving a Rope / Save a Rope (1948; Fortune)
 Shrouded Death (1950; Clunk)

Other Books
 Forty Years After (1914) with WL Courtney

Other Mr Fortune short stories 
See Radio plays and talks also
 TITLE UNKNOWN. Windsor Magazine, December 1931
 The Thistle Down. The Queen's Book of the Red Cross (1939). Published in Bodies from the Library 5, ed. Tony Medawar (HarperCollins, 2021).

Uncollected non-series short stories

 Dolly and Dick. Longman's Magazine, October 1901
 The Knight of Mayford. Windsor Magazine, January 1902
 Sir Albert's Fall. Windsor Magazine, July 1902
 Dominique. Macmillan's Magazine, November 1902
 The King's Way. Windsor Magazine, December 1902
 The Nun of Newstead. Windsor Magazine, December 1903
 The Torpedo Lieutenant. The Realm, March 1904
 The Deplorable Princess. The Realm, July 1904
 The Devil of Marston. Windsor Magazine, July 1904
 The Anachronism. Pall Mall Magazine, October 1904
 The Lone Hand. Windsor Magazine, December 1904
 A Plot in the Duchy. Pall Mall Magazine, January 1905
 Ercole. Illustrated London News, 1 July 1905
 Sir Bertram's Tryst. Windsor Magazine, August 1905
 The Men in Buckram. Windsor Magazine, September 1905
 Mrs Cromwell's Heart. Windsor Magazine, September 1905
 The Golden Whistle. The Century, June 1906
 How He Won His Throne. Pall Mall Magazine, November 1907
 My Lady's Lord. Pall Mall Magazine, January 1908
 TITLE UNKNOWN. Windsor Magazine, February 1908
 Double Sculls. The Strand Magazine, August 1908
 Hungry Hours. Pall Mall Magazine, December 1908
 The Lonely Queen. Pall Mall Magazine, July to December 1910
 The Fairy Prince. Pall Mall Magazine, July 1911
 Charles Is Engaged. Daily Telegraph, 3 August 1912
 The Woman Who Cried. Daily Telegraph, 5 August 1912
 The Hopkins Romance. Pall Mall Magazine, August 1913
 The Jolly Roger. Adelaide Advertiser, 21 March 1914. Earlier publication not yet traced
 The Bagman, July 1918
 The Young Folks. The Quiver, July 1919
 The Child, July 1920
 The Old Bureau, May 1921
 The Country Cottage. Grand Magazine, August 1921
 The Tortoise Sonata. Gaiety, December 1921
 The Golden Fleece. The Scotsman, 18 December 1926
 Victoria Pumphrey. Holly Leaves (Illustrated Sporting and Dramatic News), December 1939 Published in Bodies from the Library 1, ed. Tony Medawar (HarperCollins, 2021).

Poetry
 Spring in Arden. Programme for the matinee performance at the Theatre Royal, Drury Lane, in aid of the Shakespeare Memorial Theatre Fund at Stratford on Avon

Theatre plays
 Beaujeu by H C Bailey and David Kimball. English Play Society, 23 and 24 May 1909. Adapted from the novel by H C Bailey 
 The White Hawk by H C Bailey and David Kimball. English Play Society, 3 June 1909

Radio plays and talks
 Meet Mr Fortune. Meet the Detective. BBC Empire Service. Date unknown (Mr Fortune profile, narrated by H. C. Bailey).
 The Only Husband. Plays by Members of the Detection Club, No. 8. BBC National Programme, 14 and 21 June 1941 (Mr Fortune radio play). Published in Bodies from the Library 4, ed. Tony Medawar (HarperCollins, 2021).

Uncollected non-fiction and journalism
 The Pageant of England: I The Coming of Caesar. Pall Mall Magazine, May 1908
 The Pageant of England: II Alfred the King. Pall Mall Magazine, June 1908 
 The Pageant of England: III William the Norman. Pall Mall Magazine, July 1908
 The Pageant of England: IV King John Comes to Heel. Pall Mall Magazine, August 1908
 The Pageant of England: V The Merry King. Pall Mall Magazine, September 1908
 The Pageant of England: VI The Angel of Revolution. Pall Mall Magazine, October 1908
 The Pageant of England: VII TITLE UNKNOWN. Pall Mall Magazine, November 1908
 Good Form. Daily Telegraph, 30 November 1911
 The Stage and the Study. Daily Telegraph, 22 April 1916
 The Air Force: I - The Young Idea. Daily Telegraph, 26 September 1918
 The Air Force: II - The Wings. Daily Telegraph, 27 September 1918
 The Air Force: III - The Day's Work. Daily Telegraph, 2 October 1918
 The Great Advance: From Amiens to Le Cateau. Daily Telegraph, 26 October 1918
 Out at Last. Daily Telegraph, 22 November 1918
 German Fleet in the Firth of Forth. Daily Telegraph, 23 November 1918
 American Sea Power. Daily Telegraph, 16 December 1918
 Our Armies in Germany I. Daily Telegraph, 8 January 1919
 Our Armies in Germany II. Daily Telegraph, 9 January 1919
 Guards' Colours. Daily Telegraph, 11 January 1919
 Soldiers' Verdict on Cologne. Daily Telegraph, 11 January 1919
 Shock to Cologne. Daily Telegraph, 13 January 1919
 Rhine Provinces and United Germany. Daily Telegraph, 14 January 1919
 Luxembourg. Daily Telegraph, 16 January 1919
 On the Trail of Revolutions. Daily Telegraph, 17 January 1919
 Prince of Wales in Cologne. Daily Telegraph, 18 January 1919
 British Pantomime in Cologne Theatre. Daily Telegraph, 20 January 1919
 Campaign of 1918. Daily Telegraph, 20 January 1919
 Castle of Burg. Daily Telegraph, 22 January 1919
 Election Day in Cologne. Daily Telegraph, 22 January 1919
 German Elections. Daily Telegraph, 23 January 1919
 A Visit to Bonn. Daily Telegraph, 24 January 1919
 Germany's Problems. Daily Telegraph, 27 January 1919
 British Troops in Brussels. Daily Telegraph, 28 January 1919
 Jovial Belgians and Whining Germans. Daily Telegraph, 28 January 1919
 War's Effect in Lille and Douai. Daily Telegraph, 29 January 1919
 Our Men in Flanders. Daily Telegraph, 30 January 1919
 Scenes in Lille. Daily Telegraph, 30 January 1919
 The Last of the Ballets. Daily Telegraph, 14 March 1919
 Easter in Arden. Daily Telegraph, 24 April 1919
 Shakespeare Festival. Daily Telegraph, 25 April 1919
 War and the Theatre. Daily Telegraph, 16 May 1919
 Stage Heroes. Daily Telegraph, 5 June 1919
 Joy in the Theatre. Daily Telegraph, 26 June 1919
 Novels on the Stage. Daily Telegraph, 10 July 1919
 New York to Norfolk. Daily Telegraph, 14 July 1919
 The Naval Pageant. Daily Telegraph, 18 July 1919
 The Day Before. Daily Telegraph, 19 July 1919
 London's Tribute to Our War Heroes. Daily Telegraph, 21 July 1919
 Play and Pageant. Daily Telegraph, 24 July 1919
 Death of Mr Andrew Carnegie. Daily Telegraph, 12 August 1919
 Shakespeare Repertory I . Daily Telegraph, 27 August 1919
 Shakespeare Repertory II. Daily Telegraph, 28 August 1919
 Women Dramatists. Daily Telegraph, 28 August 1919
 The First Hamlet. Daily Telegraph, 24 September 1919
 The Coming of Children. Daily Telegraph, 13 December 1919
 Christmas Time. Daily Telegraph, 20 December 1919
 Leap Year. Daily Telegraph, 27 December 1919
 Julius Caesar. Daily Telegraph, 8 January 1920
 The Future. Daily Telegraph, 10 January 1920
 The Other Dramatists. Daily Telegraph, 22 January 1920
 Clothes and the Woman. Daily Telegraph, 31 January 1920
 Second Thoughts. Daily Telegraph, 7 February 1920
 Use of the Novel. Daily Telegraph, 13 March 1920
 King and People at the Cenotaph. Daily Telegraph, 12 November 1920
 Armistice Day. Daily Telegraph, 17 November 1920
 The Story of Landru's Trial. Daily Telegraph, 2 December 1921
 Phenomena of the Seance I. Daily Telegraph, 30 January 1922. Parts II and II were by other writers
 Pageant of Pomp in Westminster Abbey. Daily Telegraph, 1 March 1922
 Old Clowns and New. Daily Telegraph, 9 November 1922
 A Fantasy of Finance. Daily Telegraph, 7 December 1922
 The Ilford Murder. Daily Telegraph, 14 December 1922
 A New Holiday. Daily Telegraph, 30 June 1923
 Wilkie Collins. Daily Telegraph, 8 January 1924
 The Wheel of Fashion. Daily Telegraph, 2 December 1927
 Incompatible Minds. Daily Telegraph, 11 September 1928
 Continents of Romance. Daily Telegraph, 6 May 1929
 Epsom's Endless Magic. Daily Telegraph, 9 June 1929
 The Elegance of Ascot. Daily Telegraph, 17 June 1929
 Abbey Service for Earl of Balfour. Daily Telegraph, 24 March 1930
 Parents and Children. Daily Telegraph, 7 July 1930
 R101 Memorial Service in St Pauls. Daily Telegraph, 11 October 1930
 Homilies upon Drink. Daily Telegraph, 8 November 1930
 A Novelty in Duelling. Daily Telegraph, 15 November 1930
 Smokers Old and New. Daily Telegraph, 22 November 1930
 Apologists for Age. Daily Telegraph, 29 November 1930
 Drinking as a Fine Art. Daily Telegraph, 3 December 1930
 Two Judges on Perjury. Daily Telegraph, 6 December 1930
 Truth in the Crowd. Daily Telegraph, 13 December 1930
 Penalty of Death: Gross Distortions in the Futile Report of the Sentimentalists. Daily Telegraph, 17 December 1930
 The Christmas Spirit. Daily Telegraph, 20 December 1930
 New Year's Revels. Daily Telegraph, 27 December 1930
 Optimism or Despondency. Daily Telegraph, 3 January 1931
 Coincidence and Destiny. Daily Telegraph, 10 January 1931
 Men Destined to Crime. Daily Telegraph, 13 January 1931
 Art of Gormandise. Daily Telegraph, 17 January 1931
 On Living for Ever. Daily Telegraph, 24 January 1931
 Marriage down the Ages. Daily Telegraph, 31 January 1931
 Trouble with Our Names. Daily Telegraph, 7 February 1931
 Companion of Witches. Daily Telegraph, 12 February 1931
 Men's Stories for Women. Daily Telegraph, 14 February 1931
 Holmes and His 'Dear Watson. Daily Telegraph, 21 February 1931
 The Slavery of Tobacco. Daily Telegraph, 28 February 1931
 A Dream of the 'Fifties. Daily Telegraph, 7 March 1931
 The English Character. Daily Telegraph, 14 March 1931
 Morals and the Censor. Daily Telegraph, 21 March 1931
 The Mortality of Literary Fame. Daily Telegraph, 28 March 1931
 Diplomacy as Practised down the Ages. Daily Telegraph, 4 April 1931
 Portraits in Novels. Daily Telegraph, 11 April 1931
 Food and Feasting through the Ages. Daily Telegraph, 18 April 1931
 The Danger of Leisure. Daily Telegraph, 25 April 1931
 New Electric Age. Daily Telegraph, 2 May 1931
 Behind Our Dreams. Daily Telegraph, 9 May 1931
 Value of the 'Varsities. Daily Telegraph, 16 May 1931
 Lovely Womanhood through the Ages. Daily Telegraph, 23 May 1931
 Saint Joan of Arc. Daily Telegraph, 26 May 1931
 Are We English Human?. Daily Telegraph, 30 May 1931
 Looking Far Ahead. Daily Telegraph, 6 June 1931
 Going Down: The Choice of Careers. Daily Telegraph, 13 June 1931
 The Londoner's Spirit. Daily Telegraph, 20 June 1931
 The Victorian Father. Daily Telegraph, 27 June 1931
 The Art of Eating. Daily Telegraph, 4 July 1931
 Our Conversation. Daily Telegraph, 11 July 1931
 Love and Science. Daily Telegraph, 18 July 1931
 Good Haters. Daily Telegraph, 25 July 1931
 Our Crowded Holidays. Daily Telegraph, 1 August 1931
 Happy, though Modern. Daily Telegraph, 12 September 1931
 On Choice of Wines. Daily Telegraph, 19 September 1931
 Return of the Periwig. Daily Telegraph, 26 September 1931
 Ourselves in Duplicate. Daily Telegraph, 3 October 1931
 Mystery Man of Science. Daily Telegraph, 10 October 1931
 Liberties of the Pulpit. Daily Telegraph, 17 October 1931
 The Decline of Lunch. Daily Telegraph, 24 October 1931
 Legends of the Beard. Daily Telegraph, 31 October 1931
 Food in Books. Daily Telegraph, 7 November 1931
 More Marriage Theories. Daily Telegraph, 14 November 1931
 Gentle Shocking of Our Forefathers. Daily Telegraph, 21 November 1931
 The Castaway. Daily Telegraph, 23 November 1931
 Cowper's Misery. Daily Telegraph, 26 November 1931
 Marriage a la Mode. Daily Telegraph, 28 November 1931
 The Wassail Bowl. Daily Telegraph, 5 December 1931
 Christmas Pleasures. Daily Telegraph, 12 December 1931
 Children as Sightseers. Daily Telegraph, 19 December 1931
 New Year Resolutions. Daily Telegraph, 2 January 1932
 Exhibition Humbug. Daily Telegraph, 9 January 1932
 Short Men and Tall Men. Daily Telegraph, 16 January 1932
 Degradation of Wives. Daily Telegraph, 23 January 1932
 Lewis Carroll and His Immortal Alice. Daily Telegraph, 27 January 1932
 Prizes Won at School. Daily Telegraph, 6 February 1932
 Family Inquisition Myths. Daily Telegraph, 20 February 1932
 Daily Telegraph Literary Prize No 6 Result. Daily Telegraph, 23 February 1932
 Leap Day Tradition. Daily Telegraph, 27 February 1932
 That Cockney Conceit. Daily Telegraph, 5 March 1932
 That House of Our Dreams. Daily Telegraph, 12 March 1932
 Coaxing back a British Appetite. Daily Telegraph, 19 March 1932
 Thieves' Slang in fact and Fiction. Daily Telegraph, 26 March 1932
 Is Youth Overdoing the Cult of Sport. Daily Telegraph, 2 April 1932
 The Luck of the Sexes. Daily Telegraph, 9 April 1932
 Cigarette Smoking. Daily Telegraph, 16 April 1932
 State-Nursed Britain. Daily Telegraph, 7 May 1932
 When Mischief Comes to Children. Daily Telegraph, 16 May 1932
 The Beauty of Britain. Daily Telegraph, 26 May 1932
 Last Few Survivals of Snobbery. Daily Telegraph, 28 May 1932
 Scenes That Linger in the Memory. Daily Telegraph, 30 May 1932
 Who Shall Arrange Our Private Budgets?. Daily Telegraph, 4 June 1932
 Speeding up Travelling. Daily Telegraph, 11 June 1932
 Holidays in August. Daily Telegraph, 18 June 1932
 On Hiking and Hikers. Daily Telegraph, 21 June 1932
 When the Sparkle Went into Champagne. Daily Telegraph, 25 June 1932
 Sorcery Still Lives. Daily Telegraph, 2 July 1932
 Team Games for Girls. Daily Telegraph, 9 July 1932
 Modern Family Life Relies on Freedom. Daily Telegraph, 16 July 1932
 The Evil of Our School Examinations. Daily Telegraph, 23 July 1932
 Our Holiday Haunts. Daily Telegraph, 2 August 1932
 Is Pure English Doomed?. Daily Telegraph, 6 August 1932. Reprinted as The Future of English. New York Times, 28 August 1932
 The School Certificate. Daily Telegraph, 15 October 1932
 Why Britain is Paying £19,750,000 to US today. Daily Telegraph, 15 December 1932
 Professor Saintsbury, the Critic. Daily Telegraph, 30 January 1933
 Is This Age Soft?. Daily Telegraph, 14 September 1933
 Star Spangled Sportsman. Daily Telegraph, 18 September 1933
 A City's Revolution in Poor Law Relief. Daily Telegraph, 22 May 1934
 The Germans' Tribal God: Reverence for Hindenburg as Exemplar of Their Race and Nation. Daily Telegraph, 3 August 1934
 Parliaments of the Past and the India Problem. Daily Telegraph, 19 October 1934
 Remodelling the French Republic. Daily Telegraph, 29 October 1934
 Saarlanders at the Poll. Daily Telegraph, 14 January 1935
 How the Nation's Unity Was Eclipsed at St Paul's. Daily Telegraph, 7 May 1935
 When Mr Haig Thought Mr Lloyd George 'Ungentlemanly'''. Daily Telegraph, 3 October 1935
 Thirty Years the Guide of British Socialism. (London) Daily Telegraph,  21 October 1935
 Four Years of Parliament. Daily Telegraph, 26 October 1935
 Change in London's Sunday. Daily Telegraph, 1 November 1935
 Election Time in Fiction. Daily Telegraph, 16 November 1935
 Mark Twain: America's Best Loved Humorist. Daily Telegraph, 30 November 1935
 Kipling, Imperial Poet the World Acclaimed. Daily Telegraph, 18 January 1936
 Power of the Crown Today. Daily Telegraph, 23 January 1936
 Mr Lloyd George's War-Strained Mood. Daily Telegraph, 24 September 1936
 Sir James Barrie as Genius, Man and Friend. Daily Telegraph, 21 June 1937
 Can Britain Save Its Countryside. Daily Telegraph,  20 August 1938
 Hitler's Grim Six-Year Record in Technique and Perfidy. Daily Telegraph, 4 September 1939. Reprinted as Hitler's Record of Perfidy. The Times of India, 21 September 1939
 Britain Has Always Fought Europe's Ambitious Despots. Daily Telegraph, 9 September 1939
 These Men Set Reason at Defiance to Launch a War. Daily Telegraph, 23 September 1939
 No Scheming by Germany Will Defeat the Allied Blockade. Daily Telegraph, 10 October 1939 
 Germany is the Next Great Objective. Daily Telegraph, 18 October 1939
 Resources of Empire will be Massed to Our Final Victory. Daily Telegraph, 26 October 1939
 Absent Businesses are Slowing down the Economic Machine. Daily Telegraph, 9 November 1939
 Foch Was Unrelenting Till Germany's Envoys Sued for Peace. Daily Telegraph, 11 November 1939
 Should We Have a Super-Minister of Economics?. Daily Telegraph, 7 February 1940
 Strategy of Britain's New Overseas Trade Drive. Daily Telegraph, 6 March 1940
 Peril of Isolation Is Realised by Europe's Neutrals Now. Daily Telegraph, 15 March 1940
 Hitler Has Forfeited High Stakes in Norway Campaign. Daily Telegraph, 6 May 1940
 Sea Power Will Always Decide a Mediterannean War. Daily Telegraph, 5 June 1940
 Desert and Sea have Always Saved Egypt from Conquest. Daily Telegraph, 19 August 1940
 Mr Churchill at 66: 'Vehement, High and Daring. Daily Telegraph, 30 November 1940
 Soldier, Scout and Law Giver to the World's Youth. Daily Telegraph, 9 January 1941
 The Kaiser Sacrificed Both People and Throne. Daily Telegraph, 5 June 1941
 Middle of the Nation [TO BE CHECKED]. Daily Telegraph, 11 July 1941
 Prince's Life of Service for Crown and Commonwealth. Daily Telegraph, 17 January 1942
 1918: The Germans Must See 1944 Ominous Portents. Daily Telegraph, 22 July 1944
 In Antwerp, Germany Has Lost a Valuable Stronghold. Daily Telegraph, 6 September 1944
 Germany Struck down through an Earlier Siegfried Line. Daily Telegraph, 8 September 1944
 Six Years of Ordeal to Win the World's Freedom. Daily Telegraph, 8 May 1945
 The Left Was Never Right on Pre-War Defence Policy. Daily Telegraph, 1 June 1945
 Socialist Party's Black Record between the Wars. Daily Telegraph,  8 June 1945
 Releasing the Mighty Forces Locked up in the Atom. Daily Telegraph, 8 August 1945. Reprinted: Union Jack (Central Italy edition), 16 August 1945, as The Atom Is Indeed Mighty Conservatives in Council. Daily Telegraph, 28 November 1945
 The King's Fiftieth Birthday. Daily Telegraph, 14 December 1945
 Britain's Most Wonderful Year. Daily Telegraph, 31 December 1945
 Greatest Seaborne Invasion in History. Daily Telegraph, 11 January 1946

Letters to the press
 Tram Memories. (London) Daily Telegraph, 30 June 1952

References

 Murder Will Out: The Detective in Fiction'', T. J. Binyon (Oxford, 1989)  pp. 22–26

External links
 
 
 
 

1878 births
1961 deaths
English short story writers
English male novelists
English crime fiction writers
Members of the Detection Club
English mystery writers
English historical novelists
Writers of historical fiction set in the Middle Ages
Writers of historical fiction set in the early modern period